Kates Hill, or Kate's Hill, is a residential area in Dudley, West Midlands, England.

History
Kates Hill was the scene of chaos in 1648 when parliamentarians used it as their base in the Civil War against King Charles I. As a result, many roads in the area are named in honour of parliamentary figures from that era and afterwards; these include Oliver Cromwell (Oliver Close and Cromwell Street) and Robert Peel (Peel Street).

It is believed that from Cromwell Street, parliamentary leader Oliver Cromwell fired his cannons at the royalist garrison that was Dudley's Norman Castle.

Kates Hill was not developed as a residential area until around the 1830s, when a large number of houses were built to accommodate people moving to the Black Country in hope of landing jobs in the ever-growing number of factories and coalpits that were being created in the region at this time. In 1840, St John's Parish Church was opened and an adjoining church school was built soon afterwards to serve the growing community.

Despite hundreds of houses being built around St John's Church during the 19th century and at the beginning of the 20th century, as recently as World War II, Kates Hill was surrounded by a substantial amount of farmland. There is still standing a historic grade II listed farm house, dating from the 17th century, at the top of Watsons Green Road; it is now solely a residential property as its farmland has long since been built on.

This largely rural scene disappeared after 1915, as hundreds of council houses were built in the Watson's Green Road, Highfield Road, Corporation Road and Bunns Lane areas to accommodate families who were being rehoused. These included the very first council houses to be built in Dudley, built on the Brewery Fields Estate, land which was purchased by the council in 1915 and which was completed by 1918 consisting of more than 300 houses. Most of the roads on this development were named after prominent British historical figures of the Great War; these include Kitchener Road (Herbert Kitchener), Cavell Road (Edith Cavell) and Haig Road (Douglas Haig).

More houses were built in Watson's Green Road, Bridgewater Crescent and on the eastern side of Bunns Lane in the mid 1920s.

Wolverton Road and the western section of Corporation Road were added at the beginning of the 1930s, and the Rosland estate which includes Green Park Road and Lupin Road was added in the late 1930s.

Some of the oldest houses on Kates Hill were demolished in the late 1930s, and by 1978 almost all of the 19th century houses in the area to the east of St John's Road had been demolished.

The Rosland Estate was expanded in the late 1970s when several houses, along with warden-controlled bungalows and flats for elderly residents, were built in Iris Close. In the early 1980s, similar bungalows and houses were built between St John's Road and Peel Street.

Many of the newer properties on Kates Hill - notably blocks of four flats with two houses adjoining, with garages underneath the flats - are unique to the area, having been designed by an architect who received an award for designing the area's new homes which were built in 1976/77. They were built around the Peel Street area of Kates Hill, and a network of alleyways runs among the flats. This was initially popular with the estate's first tenants, as planners hoped to re-create the old-fashioned sense of community that had existed on Kates Hill earlier in the century. But this proved to be unsuccessful as initially the alleyways were popular with drug addicts, vandals and muggers. They also provided an illegal shortcut for motorcyclists. These problems have been gradually reduced since the late 1990s.

From the 1950s, Kates Hill was a popular destination for Commonwealth immigrants, mainly Pakistani Muslims. Racial tension in the area culminated in a string of violent clashes between white and Asian youths in August and September 1991.

The original Kates Hill Council School on Peel Street was built during the second half of the 19th century when the residential area was first being developed. Part of the school was damaged by fire on 24 June 1969; shortly afterwards plans for a new school nearby were unveiled, and the new Kates Hill Primary School was completed during 1972, being officially opened on 2 May 1973 by Alderman Morris, Mayor of Dudley. The new school incorporated a nursery unit for 4-year-olds (and from the mid-1980s also 3-year-olds), meaning that it served the 3–12 age range until July 1990, after which it was redesignated as a 3–11 school.

St John's Primary School moved to new buildings in Hillcrest Road on its merger with St Edmund's Primary School, also during the 1970s. But the old St John's school buildings are still standing and have since been used by several different businesses as well as local community groups.

Rosland Secondary School was opened on Beechwood Road in 1932, and it merged with the Blue Coat School on Bean Road in 1970; with the Blue Coat School existing entirely within the Rosland buildings after 1981. It closed in 1989 on a merger with The Dudley School, which saw the formation of Castle High School in the town centre. It remained open for a year as an annexe to Castle High, as there was inadequate space for pupils at the Dudley School site until September 1990. In 1991, the Blue Coat buildings were converted into St Thomas's Community Network, which remained there until its closure in September 2015. The buildings were demolished a year later to make way for a new housing.

Kates Hill has changed dramatically since the early 20th century, yet still retains many pre-1900 buildings; these include St John's Church and St John's School (though now in use as offices), as well as many late 19th-century houses situated around St John's Road. A few of the area's newer buildings have also been demolished. The Freebodies public house, built in St John's Road in the late 1970s, was demolished in 2014 after standing empty for six years. Several 1930s council houses in Cypress Road were demolished in the 1970s due to mining subsidence; flats and bungalows were later built on the site.

An independent small press, The Kates Hill Press, was established in the area in 1992 and continues to function in Dudley.

St John's Church 

St John's Church was Grade II listed by English Heritage on 21 May 2009. following an application made by St John's Church Preservation Group.

The graveyard houses the famous Tipton Slasher, and internationally known education leader and artist Marion Richardson. Also the Hansons family (Hansons Beer).

See also
Gornal
Wrens Nest Estate
Russells Hall Estate
Kingswinford

References

Other sources
 Black Country Bugle (2 June 2005)

Areas of Dudley